Phyllonorycter splendidus is a moth of the family Gracillariidae. It is known from Mexico.

The larvae feed on Platanus lindeniana and Platanus mexicana. They mine the leaves of their host plant.

References

Moths described in 2013
splendidus
Moths of Central America